Noxon Bank Building is a historic bank building located at Crescent in Saratoga County, New York.  It was built in 1842 and is a three-story, square, hipped roof structure of brick and stone in the Greek Revival style.  There is a two-story, hipped roofed brick wing.  The entrance features cut limestone Tuscan order columns and pilasters.

It was listed on the National Register of Historic Places in 2003.

References

Bank buildings on the National Register of Historic Places in New York (state)
Greek Revival architecture in New York (state)
Commercial buildings completed in 1842
Buildings and structures in Saratoga County, New York
National Register of Historic Places in Saratoga County, New York
1842 establishments in New York (state)